The 2017 Rio de Janeiro Soccer Tournament was the 114th edition of the top tier football of FFERJ (Federação de Futebol do Estado do Rio de Janeiro, or Rio de Janeiro State Football Federation). The top four teams competed in the 2017 Brazilian Football Cup.

Unlike previous editions of the Tournament, there was a preliminary stage played by the bottom four teams from the previous edition, and the top two teams from the latest edition of Série B (second tier), totaling six teams. The top two scoring teams were qualified for the final phase. The remaining four teams competed in a new bracket being eliminated from the final phase. The bottom two were relegated to the second tier in the next edition. The final phase was played in two separate groups of six teams each, including the two teams qualified from the initial phase, one in each bracket.

Participating teams

First round (Group A)

Championship round

Taça Guanabara

Group stage

Group B

Group C

Knockout stage

Semi-finals

Final

Taça Rio

Group stage

Group B

Group C

Knockout stage

Semi-finals

Final

Relegation playoffs

Overall table

Final stage

Semi-finals

Final

Awards

Team of the year
Manager: Abel Braga (Fluminense)

References

Campeonato Carioca seasons
Carioca